Future City is an unincorporated community in Alexander County, Illinois, United States. Future City is located along U.S. Route 51 north of Cairo, and south of Urbandale.

The town was founded as a suburb of Cairo in the early 1900s and was populated almost entirely by African Americans. Much of the town was damaged during a flood in 1912 but was quickly rebuilt. However, the town was once again devastated in 1913 during the Great Flood of 1913 with every building in town being damaged or moved during the flood. Only a few residents remain in Future City today.

Education
It is in the Cairo School District. Future City used to have a school named Bruce School. It is unknown when it closed.

References

Unincorporated communities in Alexander County, Illinois
Unincorporated communities in Illinois